UEFA U-19 Championship 2007 (qualifying round) was the first round of qualifications for the final tournament of UEFA U-19 Championship 2007. 48 teams are split into 12 groups of 4 and teams in each group play each other once. The top two teams in each group and the best third-placed team will enter UEFA U-19 Championship 2007 (Elite Round).

Matches

Group 1

Group 2

Group 3

Group 4

Group 5

Group 6

Group 7

Group 8

Group 9

Group 10

Group 11

Group 12

3rd place table
The best third-placed team was determined by the results against the top two teams of the same group.

Qualification
UEFA European Under-19 Championship qualification